The Vancouver Villas were a junior ice hockey team based in Vancouver, British Columbia that played four seasons in the BCJHL from 1969-73. The franchise played for three seasons as the "Centennials" and became the Villas for the 1972-73 season before folding.

Season-by-season Record

Note: GP = Games played, W = Wins, L = Losses, T = Ties Pts = Points, GF = Goals for, GA = Goals against

See also
List of ice hockey teams in British Columbia

References
2006-07 BCHL Guide & Record Book
hockeydb.com

Ice hockey teams in British Columbia
Defunct ice hockey teams in Canada
Vill
1969 establishments in British Columbia
1973 disestablishments in British Columbia
Ice hockey clubs established in 1969
Ice hockey clubs disestablished in 1973